The 1992 British Speedway Championship was the 32nd edition of the British Speedway Championship. The Final took place on 17 May at Brandon in Coventry, England. The Championship was won by Gary Havelock, who won a run-off against Martin Dugard after both finished on 13 points.

Final 
17 May 1992
 Brandon Stadium, Coventry

{| width=100%
|width=50% valign=top|

See also 
 British Speedway Championship
 1992 Individual Speedway World Championship

References 

British Speedway Championship
Great Britain